Tolstoy: A Russian Life is a 2010 biography of Leo Tolstoy written by Rosamund Bartlett.

Bibliography

External links 

 
 Author's website

2010 non-fiction books
Biographies (books)
English-language books
Houghton Mifflin books
Leo Tolstoy
Profile Books books